Alexey Leonidovich Pajitnov (born April 16, 1955) is a Soviet-born American computer engineer and video game designer. He is best-known for creating, designing and developing Tetris in 1984 while working at the Dorodnitsyn Computing Centre under the Academy of Sciences of the Soviet Union (now the Russian Academy of Sciences).

In 1991, he moved to the United States and later became a U.S. citizen. In 1996, Pajitnov founded The Tetris Company alongside Dutch video game designer Henk Rogers. Pajitnov did not receive royalties from Tetris prior to this time, despite the game's high popularity.

Early life and education
Pajitnov was born to parents who were both writers. His father was an art critic. His mother was a journalist who wrote for both newspapers and a film magazine. It was through his parents that Pajitnov gained exposure to the arts, eventually developing a passion for cinema. He accompanied his mother to many film screenings, including the Moscow Film Festival. Pajitnov was also mathematically inclined, enjoying puzzles and problem solving.

In 1967, when he was 11 years old, Pajitnov's parents divorced. For several years, he lived with his mother in a one-bedroom apartment owned by the state. The two were eventually able to move into a private apartment at 49 Gertsen Street, when Pajitnov was 17. He later went on to study applied mathematics at the Moscow Aviation Institute.

Career 
In 1977, Pajitnov worked as a summer intern at the Soviet Academy of Sciences. Once he graduated in 1979, he accepted a job there working on speech recognition at the Academy's Dorodnitsyn Computing Centre. When the Computing Centre received new equipment, its researchers would write a small program for it in order to test its computing capabilities. According to Pajitnov, this "became [his] excuse for making games". Computer games were fascinating to him because they offered a way to bridge the gap between logic and emotion, and Pajitnov held interests in both mathematics and puzzles, as well as the psychology of computing.

Searching for inspiration, Pajitnov recalled his childhood memories of playing pentominoes, a game where you create pictures using its shapes. Remembering the difficulty he had in putting the pieces back into their box, Pajitnov felt inspired to create a game based on that concept. Using an Electronika 60 in the Computing Centre, he began working on what would become the first version of Tetris. Building the first prototype in two weeks, Pajitnov spent longer playtesting and adding to the game, completing it on June 6, 1984. This primitive version did not have levels or a scoring system, but Pajitnov knew he had a potentially great game, since he couldn't stop playing it at work. 

The game attracted the interest of coworkers like fellow programmer Dmitri Pevlovsky, who helped Pajitnov connect with Vadim Gerasimov, a 16-year-old intern at the Soviet Academy. Pajitnov wanted to make a color version of Tetris for the IBM Personal Computer, and enlisted the intern to help. Gerasimov created the PC version in less than three weeks, and with contributions from Pevlovsky, spent an additional month adding new features like scorekeeping and sound effects. The game, first available in the Soviet Union, appeared in the West in 1986.

Pajitnov created a sequel to Tetris, entitled Welltris, which has the same principle, but in a three-dimensional environment where the player sees the playing area from above. Tetris was licensed and managed by Soviet company ELORG, which had a monopoly on the import and export of computer hardware and software in the Soviet Union, and advertised with the slogan "From Russia with Love" (on NES: "From Russia with Fun!"). Because he was employed by the Soviet government, Pajitnov did not receive royalties.

Pajitnov, together with Vladimir Pokhilko, moved to the United States in 1991 and later, in 1996, founded The Tetris Company with Henk Rogers, which finally allowed him to collect royalties from his game. He helped design the puzzles in the Super NES versions of Yoshi's Cookie and designed the game Pandora's Box, which incorporates more traditional jigsaw-style puzzles. Pajitnov and Pokhilko founded the 3D software technology company AnimaTek, which developed the game / screensaver El-Fish.  

He was employed by Microsoft from October 1996 until 2005. While there, he worked on the Microsoft Entertainment Pack: The Puzzle Collection, MSN Mind Aerobics and MSN Games groups. Pajitnov's new, enhanced version of Hexic, Hexic HD, was included with every new Xbox 360 Premium package.

In August 2005, WildSnake Software announced that Pajitnov would be collaborating with them to release a new line of puzzle games.

Personal life
Pajitnov moved to the United States in 1991, was naturalized as a U.S. citizen and now resides in Clyde Hill, Washington. He has a wife, Nina, with whom he had two sons named Peter and Dmitri. Dmitri died in a skiing accident on Mount Rainier in 2017.

Political views 
After the 2022 Russian invasion of Ukraine, Pajitnov issues a statement condemning the war that called Vladimir Putin a "soulless crazy dictator" and that "his hateful regime will fall down and the normal peaceful way of living will be restored in Ukraine and, hopefully in Russia."

Games

Awards and recognition
In 1996, GameSpot named him as the fourth most influential computer game developer of all time.

In March 2007, he received the Game Developers Choice Awards First Penguin Award. The award was given for pioneering the casual games market.

In June 2009, he received the honorary award at the LARA - Der Deutsche Games Award in Cologne, Germany.

In 2012, IGN included Pajitnov on their list of 5 Memorable Video Game Industry One-Hit Wonders, calling him "the ultimate video game one-hit wonder."

On 2015, Pajitnov won the Bizkaia Award at the Fun & Serious Game Festival.

See also
BreakThru!, video game endorsed by Pajitnov
ClockWerx, video game endorsed by Pajitnov

Notes

References

External links

Alexey L. Pajitnov profile at MobyGames
Tetris Creator Claims Free and Open Source Software Destroys the Market.
 web-archives
Video Interview with Alexey Pajitnov at GameZombie.tv
 deadlink
Tetris — From Russia with Love, BBC documentary (website). 

1956 births
Living people
Game Developers Conference Pioneer Award recipients
Moscow Aviation Institute alumni
Microsoft employees
Russian activists against the 2022 Russian invasion of Ukraine
Russian computer programmers
Russian emigrants to the United States
Russian inventors
Russian video game designers
Scientists from Moscow
Soviet computer scientists
Tetris
Video game designers